Marr Grounds (21 October 1930 – 25 March 2021) was an American/Australian artist, known for his sculpture and environmental art, as an educational innovator in his career as lecturer in architecture, and as the co-founder of the Tin Sheds art workshop in Sydney.

Early life and education
Grounds was born in Los Angeles on 21 October 1930, the son of architect Sir Roy Grounds and American divorcee Regina Lammers (nee Virginia Marr). He came to Australia in 1933 with his mother and they lived near the outer-Melbourne suburb of Frankston, until 1939.

He and his mother left Australia for the US in 1939, after his father had taken up with the wife of Sir John Ramsay, son of William Ramsay, founder of Kiwi shoe polish. His parents were divorced in 1941. Grounds returned (with an American accent that never left him) to stay with his father in 1945, after his mother remarried, until 1948. During those years he attended a cram school in Melbourne, now known as Taylors College.

He served in the U.S. Navy during the Korean War from 1951 to 1955.

He studied at the College of Environmental Design at the University of California, Berkeley, graduating with a degree in architecture in 1965, before undertaking a master of arts in sculpture the following year. The campus was at the centre of the 1960s counterculture, and Grounds became part of a friendship group that included some of the key figures of that time, such as Ken Kesey, Allen Ginsberg and Jack Kerouac, hanging out at the City Lights Bookstore. He moved to the commune of Drop City in Colorado for a while after graduating.

Career
He met and married artist Joan Grounds there, and in 1966 they moved to Ghana to lecture in architecture at the Kwame Nkrumah University of Science and Technology in Kumasi, after marrying at a quick ceremony at Reno, Nevada, as it was a requirement to be married to travel there. As part of a politically active group in Berkely, Joan and Marr wanted to escape America after Ronald Reagan became Governor of California. They viewed Kwame Nkrumah as the Fidel Castro of Africa, and went to help him establish a new school of architecture; however, Nkrumah was overthrown within days of their arrival.

After a spell in Ghana, he was offered a job by Robin Boyd to lecture in architecture at the University of Sydney, starting in 1968. Not long afterwards, he co-founded the art workshop Tin Sheds in the university grounds with Donald Brook and his wife Joan. There, a group of artists, architects, engineers, and others tried to understand and define the notion of art, staying open 24/7 as students were encouraged to dream and create all manner of artworks, focusing on conceptual art

Marr initiated the creation of the Avago gallery at Tin Sheds. This was a  cube built into the wall facing  onto City Road. Many artists held their first exhibitions at Avago. It gained notoriety after a copy of a Picasso painting that had been stolen from the National Gallery of Victoria was installed there, and it was later stolen from there again.

He enjoyed lecturing in architecture, but was not interested in practising it – he preferred making art. One of his 1960s sculptures, entitled Womb with a window, was made of driftwood and steel.

Artist Imants Tillers was one of his students. He developed a working relationship with Frank Watters, whose Watters Gallery was willing to take risks with new art, and was very loyal to their artists.

In 1987 he resigned from his lecturing job and returned to the U.S. to live, but returned three years later.

Exhibitions
His art work was included in the following exhibitions:
1973, 1975 and 1978: included in the Mildura Sculpture Triennials
1975: first solo exhibition, Morphological structures, at Watters Gallery
1976: Biennale of Sydney at the Art Gallery of New South Wales, an installation called Second art bit installation, that included a sandbag bunker under a staircase, which Grounds "inhabited" with his two dogs Mutt and Pete
1981: inaugural Australian Perspecta
1981: inaugural [Australian] Sculpture Triennial
1981: sculpture exhibition in Toronto, Canada

Recognition
Grounds was given a residency at the Cité internationale des arts in Paris in 1977, followed by one in New York, for which he was given time off from his lecturing job at Sydney University. After the exhibition in Toronto in 1918, he had another short studio residency in New York, and then a year-long residency at the Künstlerhaus Bethanien in Berlin, Germany, thanks to a grant from the Visual Arts Board.

Personal life
He married artist Joan Grounds around 1966, but they divorced in the late 1970s.

He met renowned Australian artist Bonita Ely, the mother of his daughter, in 1981 in Toronto. Their daughter was born in Berlin, but was able to acquire American citizenship.

In 1987, he returned to the U.S. to live, in order to marry his "childhood sweetheart", but the relationship failed (according to Grounds, because he "couldn't handle" it, with her four kids from a previous marriage.

He renounced is American citizenship in around 2005 as a form of protest. Until the end of his life, he regarded himself as a product of the 1960s.

He said in a 2015 interview that he loved making art, but did not enjoy the social aspect of it; he would not even attend the opening of his first solo exhibition at Watters. He also said that he knew very little about his father and never really bonded with him. Their relationship was later described as "increasingly estranged", although it was a complicated one.

After his father's death, he and his half-sister Victoria inherited his estate.

Death and legacy
He died in New South Wales on 25 March 2021, after living for some years on a property near Tanja, New South Wales, in a house with an environmental design reflecting his principles.

He had an impact as an innovative educator, during his career as lecturer in architecture.

References

1930 births
2021 deaths
21st-century Australian sculptors
20th-century Australian sculptors